Schmelz is a former parade and exercise ground located in Rudolfsheim-Fünfhaus in central Vienna, Austria. It also contained the first football field of SK Rapid Wien between 1899 and 1903.

References

Year of establishment missing
Year of disestablishment missing
Parade grounds
Geography of Vienna
History of Vienna